Neoplocaederus obesus, commonly known as Cashew stem borer or Red cocoon-making longhorn, is a species of longhorn beetle native to South Asian and South East Asian countries.

Distribution
It is found in Sri Lanka, India, Andaman, Nicobar, Bangladesh, Myanmar, Thailand, Vietnam, Laos, China, Taiwan, and Bhutan.

Biology
Male is usually smaller in size with 38 mm and female is approximately 40 mm.

Particularly as sap wood borer, the female lays about 40–50 eggs in the live tissues or in the crevices of the bark at the collar region. Grubs then bore into the fresh tissues of the bark and gradually move through the sap wood by making tunnels. Finally they reach roots. Grubs feed the internal tissues for about 3–6 months. Pupal stage is about 3 to 4 months. Adults are visible from January to May usually emerged with pre monsoon rains.

Host plants

 Anacardium occidentale
 Boswellia serrata
 Buchanania cochinchinensis
 Bombax malabaricum
 Bombax heptaphyllum
 Butea monosperma
 Butea frondosa
 Caryota urens
 Cedrela toona
 Ceiba pentandra
 Cordia dichotoma
 Dracontomelon dao
 Eriodendron anfractuosum
 Garuga pinnata
 Gmelina arborea
 Kydia calycina
 Lannea coromandelica
 Mangifera indica
 Odina wodier
 Protium serratum
 Pterocarpus marsupium
 Salmalia malabarica
 Shorea robusta
 Spondias mangifera
 Sterculia colorata
 Sterculia urens
 Sterculia villosa
 Terminalia tomentosa

References 

Cerambycinae
Insects of Sri Lanka
Insects of India
Insects of Myanmar
Insects of Taiwan
Insects described in 1890